Helwan Governorate was one of the governorates of Egypt. It was located in Lower Egypt.

History
The Helwan Governorate was split from the Cairo Governorate in April 2008. It was created through a presidential decree in order to ease the burden placed on Cairo, one of Egypt's most densely populated governorates. The city of Helwan became the capital of the Helwan Governorate, which encompassed most of the eastern suburbs of Cairo, notably the affluent neighbourhood of Maadi. In April 2011, Prime Minister Essam Sharaf abolished the Helwan Governorate and reincorporated its territory into the Cairo Governorate.

Cities
 Helwan
 New Cairo (present-day location of the city is on what was the governorate)

References

See also
 Cairo Governorate
 6th of October Governorate (now defunct)

 
Former governorates of Egypt
Nile Delta
States and territories established in 2008
States and territories disestablished in 2011
2008 establishments in Egypt
2011 disestablishments in Egypt